Jake C. Files (born March 27, 1972) is a Republican politician from Fort Smith, Arkansas. Files represented portions of the Arkansas River Valley in the Arkansas House of Representatives from 1999 to 2003, and in the Arkansas Senate from 2011 to 2018.

He pleaded guilty in 2018 to wire fraud, bank fraud and money laundering relating to misuse of the state's surplus money and was sentenced to 18 months in prison.

Background

A native of Norman, Oklahoma, Files graduated cum laude with a bachelor's degree in accounting from Arkansas State University in Jonesboro. Previously, he had attended Ouachita Baptist University in Arkadelphia. He is the owner of FFH Construction, a general construction firm. From 1997 to 2004, he was the president and superintendent of the Fort Smith Christian School. Prior to that, he was hired to help start operations of the Baldor Electric Company plant in Ozark, Arkansas, as the accountant and materials manager.  He and his wife, the former Michaela K. Mitchell (born 1977), have four children and are active members of Grand Avenue Baptist Church, a Southern Baptist congregation in Fort Smith.  The senator coaches Little League baseball and basketball.

Political life
From 1999 to 2003, he represented District 12 in the Arkansas House of Representatives. Files was first elected to the State Senate in 2010 in District 13. His district number was switched through redistricting from District 13 to District 8, effective January 2013, and his district boundaries changed to include most of the cities of Greenwood and Hackett. He served on Senate committees for Revenue & Taxation, Transportation, Technology, Legislative Affairs, Joint Budget, and Senate Efficiency. He was also a member of the Joint (House and Senate) Legislative Committee on Auditing. He was chairman of the Revenue and Taxation Committee.

Fraud scandal
In early 2017, Files was accused of submitting false bids for the River Valley Sports Complex, a planned park of softball fields at Chaffee Crossing in Fort Smith. Though initially denying the charges, Files pleaded guilty to wire fraud, bank fraud and money laundering in the United States District Court for the Western District of Arkansas in January 2018. He resigned his senate seat in February.

Plea
The plea agreement says Files and Lee Webb, a member of the Sebastian County Election Commission, convinced the City of Fort Smith to appropriate $1.6 million for the project in 2014. Files then created three fictitious companies to bid for the project. He later proposed steering $150,000 of public funds from the state's General Improvement Fund (GIF) to the project. Files had control over the funds, and was chairman of the Senate Revenue and Taxation Committee. He pleaded guilty, and was sentenced to 18 months in prison and ordered to pay $83,900 in restitution.

References

1972 births
Living people
21st-century American criminals
American fraudsters
American money launderers
Arkansas politicians convicted of crimes
Ouachita Baptist University alumni
Arkansas State University alumni
Republican Party members of the Arkansas House of Representatives
Republican Party Arkansas state senators
Tea Party movement activists
People from Norman, Oklahoma
Politicians from Fort Smith, Arkansas
Businesspeople from Arkansas
American accountants
American educators
Baptists from Arkansas
21st-century American politicians
Baptists from Oklahoma